London Transport could refer to:

London Transport (brand)

Transport authorities that operated services under the brand:

London Passenger Transport Board (1933–1948)
London Transport Executive (1948–1963)
London Transport Board (1963–1970)
London Transport Executive (GLC) (1970–1984)
London Regional Transport (1984–2000)
Transport for London (TfL) (2000 onward)

See also
History of public transport authorities in London
Transport in London